U.S. Foreign Policy is a 1943 book by Walter Lippmann. It was published by Little, Brown and Company.

References

1943 non-fiction books
Books about foreign relations of the United States
Little, Brown and Company books
Books by Walter Lippmann